The AWA African Heavyweight Championship is a professional wrestling heavyweight championship owned by the Africa Wrestling Alliance (AWA) promotion. It was created in January 1990.

Title history

References

External links
Official African Wrestling Alliance Website

Africa Wrestling Alliance championships
Heavyweight wrestling championships
Continental professional wrestling championships